Battle of Podhajce may refer to

 Battle of Podhajce (1667)
 Battle of Podhajce (1698)